Ludington Area is a public school district in Ludington, Michigan.  It is the largest school district in Mason County in terms of both the number of schools and students.

Schools

Elementary school
Ludington Elementary School (Grades PreK-5)

Junior/Senior High school 
OJ DeJonge Middle School (Grades 6-8)
Ludington High School (Grades 9-12, The Orioles)

References

External links
Ludington Area Schools

School districts in Michigan
Education in Mason County, Michigan